Ben Hellewell (born 30 January 1992) is a Scotland international rugby league footballer who plays as a  forward for Salford Red Devils in the Betfred Super League.

He was contracted to the Warrington Wolves in the Super League, playing on loan from Warrington at the York City Knights in the Championship and the Barrow Raiders in Championship 1. He played for Featherstone Rovers in the Co-operative Championship, and on loan from Featherstone at the Dewsbury Rams in the Kingstone Press Championship. He has also played for the London Broncos in the Championship and in the Betfred Super League, and on loan from the Broncos at the Sheffield Eagles in the Betfred Championship. Hellewell also played for the Leigh Centurions in the second-tier and the Super League.

In 2019 he helped the Eagles to win the inaugural 1895 Cup as they defeated the Widnes Vikings 36–18 in the final. He has earned 9 caps for Scotland in the European competitions and the 2013 Rugby League World Cup.

Background
Hellewell was born in Bradford, West Yorkshire, England.

Playing career

Early career
Hellewell started his career with the Bradford Bulls, coming through the Bulls Academy at his hometown club.

Warrington
Hellewell moved to Warrington to begin his professional career. He won the Rugby League 9s tournament in June 2011 with Warrington.  In 2012 he was sent on loan from Warrington at the York City Knights in the Championship.  Hellewell spent part of 2012 on loan at the Barrow Raiders in Championship 1.

Featherstone
After failing to make a first team appearance for Warrington, he joined Featherstone Rovers in 2012, ahead of the 2013 RFL Championship season. 
He played for Featherstone Rovers in the Co-operative Championship, and on loan from Featherstone at the Dewsbury Rams in the 2014 Kingstone Press Championship.

London Broncos
He joined the London Broncos ahead of the 2015 RFL Championship season. 

In 2019 he spent time on loan from the Broncos at the Sheffield Eagles in the Betfred Championship. During that spell at the Eagles he helped the Eagles to win the inaugural 1895 Cup as they defeated Widnes 36–18 in the final.
In four years in the capital he played over 100 games, including gaining promotion to the Super League.

Leigh
He joined Leigh ahead of their 2020 RFL Championship season.

Featherstone
On 28 May 2022, Hellewell played for Featherstone in their 2022 RFL 1895 Cup final loss against Leigh.

International
He is a Scotland international having made his début in 2011. He was named in their squad for the 2013 Rugby League World Cup, and scored two tries in their 30–30 draw with Italy.

In October and November 2014, Ben played in the 2014 European Cup competition.

In October and November 2015, Ben played in the 2015 European Cup competition.

He was named in the Scotland squad for 2016 Rugby League Four Nations.

He was named in the Scotland squad for 2017 Rugby League World Cup.

References

External links

Leigh Centurions profile
London Broncos profile
SL profile
2017 RLWC profile
Scotland profile
Scotland RL profile

1992 births
Living people
Barrow Raiders players
Dewsbury Rams players
English rugby league players
English people of Scottish descent
Featherstone Rovers players
Leigh Leopards players
London Broncos players
Rugby league fullbacks
Rugby league players from Bradford
Salford Red Devils players
Scotland national rugby league team players
Sheffield Eagles players
Warrington Wolves players
York City Knights players